After the Rain is the debut album from the Christian country duo Aaron & Amanda Crabb. The album was released on January 1, 2007.

Track listing

All songs written by Aaron & Amanda Crabb, except where noted.
 "After the Rain" – 5:04
 "To Know You Are Near" – 4:48
 "Thou Art Worthy" – 4:20
 "Miracle" – 3:51
 "Everything" – 3:52
 "Not Ashamed" – 3:53
 "Alpha Omega" – 4:15
 "Give It All" – 3:38
 "Strength" – 4:31
 "God Will Make a Way" – 3:24
 "Eli's Track" – 5:32

Awards

After the Rain was nominated for a Dove Award for Inspirational Album of the Year at the 40th GMA Dove Awards.

References

External links 
 Aaron & Amanda Crabb Official Site
 After the Rain at Amazon.com

2007 debut albums